Tronji is a CG animated children's TV series and a multiplayer online game, produced in the United Kingdom and aimed at children aged six to nine years. It was commissioned by CBBC, produced by Ragdoll Productions (their first CBBC-only production for years since Teletubbies) and was distributed globally by BBC Worldwide. Andrew Davenport devised the television format for Tronji, created the key characters and is the series producer.  Anne Wood had the original concept for Tronji and was the initial producer.

The TV series launched on CBBC in May 2009, and the Beta version of the online game is available to download.

Story
Tronji takes place in the CGI-animated universe of Tronjiworld, where creatures known as Tronjis live happily. However, all of that changed when Tronjiworld was struck by a natural disaster, known simply as "Wobble", which caused immense destruction to Tronjiworld by draining away its colour and happiness and causing all Tronjis to cry, and even separated several parts of it away into an area known as The Gap, which is a space-like void filled with asteroids.

Each episode follows the Great Eek summoning three children from Peopleworld (the Tronji name for Earth) and enlisting their help in reaching the saddest part of the broken pieces of Tronji and repair the damage done using their special skills, whilst the Great Eek and Tronji-O locate Tronji-I in Peopleworld, who usually materializes within an unhappy situation, in which the Great Eek and Tronji-O will use gem power from the children to fix the situation and therefore use Double Happiness to return the broken pieces back together.

Characters
 The Great Eek is the ruler of Tronjiworld who lives within the Dome and watches over the world. He is a pale-skinned being dressed in purple, including a large top hat with a jewel on the front and carries a cane which doubles as a wand, which he uses to reconnect the broken pieces of Tronjiworld. Whenever trouble strikes in Tronjiworld and there are significant levels of sadness, he will summon three skilled children from Peopleworld to help him in fixing the problem. His catchphrases are "Wobbly-I-O!" and "What a wobbler!".
 Tronji-O is a female Tronji who has a red, egg-shaped body, a golden disc on her stomach and three short hairs on her head. She often assists The Great Eek in helping to restore happiness to Tronjiworld and Peopleworld, seeing as her brother Tronji-I always gets taken to Peopleworld whenever Wobble strikes. She communicates in a series of squeaks, including the signature Tronji phrase "Nik-Nak-Nor" and when she is upset, she wails loudly.
 Tronji-I is Tronji-O's twin brother. He is identical to his sister, except he is coloured dark blue and wears a golden belt around his stomach. Whenever Wobble strikes, he is often accidentally teleported to Peopleworld, where he usually appears within an unhappy situation, but once Tronji-O is able to make contact with him, they will use their powers to make a swap, which will usually result in the Peopleworld situation changing to happiness, but also causing another problem in Tronjiworld.
 Ooee-Ooee is a flying, cloud-like Tronji who always says his name and flashes as he does. During missions, he gives one of the children a ride to the place with the most sadness in time for the "Happy Ending". When the Great Eek uses his powers to bring the broken pieces of Tronjiworld back together, Ooey-Ooey turns golden, a result of 'Double Happiness'.
 The Gap Minders are a pair of guards who protect The Gap. In order to pass them, the children must answer the Gap Minders' Impossible Question, which is normally a mathematical question relating to the subject of the children's skills.

Episodes

External links

BBC Television shows
British television series with live action and animation
2000s British children's television series
2010s British children's television series
2009 British television series debuts
2010 British television series endings
Multiplayer online games
English-language television shows
Television series by DHX Media
Television series by Ragdoll Productions